The Politics of Ecstasy is the second full-length studio album by heavy metal band Nevermore, released in 1996. The album is named after Timothy Leary's book of the same name. The first chapter of the book is titled "The Seven Tongues of God", which is the title of the first song on the album. There is a spoken word sample in the track "Next in Line" from the Adrian Lyne movie Jacob's Ladder.

Track listing

2006 reissue

There is a hidden track (1:19) after "The Learning" ("Love Bites" in the 2006 reissue), after 5 minutes of silence.

Personnel
Warrel Dane – vocals
Jeff Loomis – guitar
Pat O'Brien – guitar
Jim Sheppard – bass
Van Williams – drums
Produced, recorded and mixed by Neil Kernon

References

1996 albums
Century Media Records albums
Nevermore albums
Albums produced by Neil Kernon